Smokin' Stogies is a 2001 American crime film starring Frank Vincent, Tony Sirico, Joseph Marino and written and directed by Vincent Di Rosa.

Premise
A gangster is sent to Miami to recover one million dollars in smuggled, and now stolen, Cuban cigars.

Cast
 Joseph Marino as Vinnie Marscone
 Frank Vincent as Johnny Big
 Tony Sirico as Tony Batts

References

External links

2001 films
2001 crime drama films
American crime drama films
American gangster films
Films about drugs
Films set in the 2000s
Films shot in Florida
Films about the American Mafia
2001 directorial debut films
2000s English-language films
2000s American films